Oliver O'Donovan is an Irish rallycross driver. He was the 2007 British Rallycross Champion, and currently competes in the FIA European Rallycross Championship as a privateer.

Results

Complete FIA World Rallycross Championship results
Supercar/RX1

Complete FIA European Rallycross Championship results

Supercar

References

1966 births
Living people
Irish racing drivers
European Rallycross Championship drivers
World Rallycross Championship drivers